.sub may refer to a computer file having .sub extension. A .sub file can be:
 MicroDVD Subtitle File, a file that contains subtitle (captioning) data for a movie or video clip
 Subchannel Data File, a file that can be a part of CloneCD image files; see CloneCD Control File 
 DirectVobSub Subtitle File, a binary file that contains subtitles (captioning) data for a movie or video clip